Jan Gorenc (born 26 July 1999) is a Slovenian professional footballer who plays as a defender for Belgian Pro League club Eupen.

Club career
In the summer of 2022, Gorenc signed a two-year contract with Eupen in Belgium.

Honours
Olimpija Ljubljana
 Slovenian Cup: 2018–19

Mura
 Slovenian PrvaLiga: 2020–21
 Slovenian Cup: 2019–20

References

1999 births
Living people
People from Brežice
Slovenian footballers
Slovenian expatriate footballers
Slovenia youth international footballers
Slovenia under-21 international footballers
Association football defenders
Slovenian PrvaLiga players
Belgian Pro League players
NK Krško players
NK Olimpija Ljubljana (2005) players
NŠ Mura players
K.A.S. Eupen players
Slovenian expatriate sportspeople in Belgium
Expatriate footballers in Belgium